The 2007 Nigerian Senate election in Adamawa State was held on 21 April 2007, to elect members of the Nigerian Senate to represent Adamawa State. Jibrin Muhammad Aminu representing Adamawa Central, Grace Folashade Bent representing Adamawa South and Mohammed Mana representing Adamawa North all won on the platform of the People's Democratic Party.

Overview

Summary

Results

Adamawa Central 
The election was won by Jibril Aminu of the Peoples Democratic Party (Nigeria).

Adamawa South 
The election was won by Grace Folashade Bent of the Peoples Democratic Party (Nigeria).

Adamawa North
The election was won by Mohammed Mana of the Peoples Democratic Party (Nigeria).

References

April 2007 events in Nigeria
Adamawa State Senate elections
Ada